Anthony Rotich (born 1991) is an American four time NCAA Division 1 Champion, twelve time NCAA Division 1 All-American track athlete. Anthony is especially accomplished in the steeplechase.

Running career

Collegiate
From Koiwa High School, Rotich was a state champion in high school. He was recruited to UTEP from El Paso, Texas, whose track and cross country program had a long history in recruiting talented runners from eastern Africa. At UTEP, Rotich was a 3 time NCAA champion in the 3000 meters steeplechase. In 2014, he won the mile at the indoor NCAAs and won the 3000-meter steeplechase at the 2014 NCAA Division I Outdoor Track and Field Championships.

In 2015, Rotich was named Conference USA track and field athlete of the year. By the time he graduated in 2015, Rotich's was awarded twelve All-American honors in NCAA track and cross country, with a total of 11 national awards.

Career finishes and statistics

College Times

National and international career
2015 All-Athletics.com World Rankings

Anthony Rotich placed fourth in 2016 Payton Jordan Invitational 3,000m steeplechase in 8:27.62 at Stanford University on 01.05.2016.

1500m	3:48.74	El Paso (USA)	25.03.2017
Mile ind.	4:03.67	Albuquerque (USA)	11.02.2017
3000mSC	8:36.39	Palo Alto (USA)	05.05.2017
Anthony Rotich placed first in 2017 Payton Jordan Invitational 3,000m steeplechase in 8:36.39 at Stanford University on 5 May 2017.

Rotich won 2018 Music City Distance Carnival steeplechase in Nashville, Tennessee in 8:34.56.

References

External links

1991 births
Living people
American male steeplechase runners
African-American male track and field athletes
Kenyan male middle-distance runners
Kenyan male long-distance runners
Sportspeople from Texas
University of Texas alumni
Kenyan male steeplechase runners
American male middle-distance runners
21st-century African-American sportspeople